Farmingville is a hamlet and census-designated place (CDP) in the Suffolk County town of Brookhaven, New York, United States. The population was 15,481 at the 2010 census.

History
The first settlement in what is now called Farmingville occurred in the late 18th century, and was called Bald Hills and Mooney Ponds, before it eventually was called Farmingville (though the soil and hills are not good for agriculture). The Keibel Family had a 72-acre fruit and vegetable farm from 1950 till 1982. It did not have its own post office until 1950.

The home of Elijah Terry, the first teacher in the local school, was built in 1823 and sits next to the Bald Hill Schoolhouse, built in 1850. The schoolhouse is in the National Register of Historic Places.

Bald Hill, one of the highest points on Long Island, is located on the Ronkonkoma Moraine, where the glacier which formed Long Island stopped its advance. At the top of Bald Hill is Vietnam Memorial Park, which includes an obelisk-shaped monument painted red, white, and blue, which was dedicated on Nov. 11, 1991. The Bald Hill Cultural Center features the outdoor Long Island Community Hospital Amphitheater and was previously the location of a ski area from 1965–1980.

Demographics

Farmingville is located in central Long Island and has low crime rates. As of the census of 2000, there were 16,458 people, 5,041 households, and 4,229 families residing in the CDP. The population density was 3,642.8 per square mile (1,405.9/km2). There were 5,170 housing units at an average density of 1,144.3/sq mi (441.6/km2). The racial makeup of the CDP was 79.9% White, 2.2% African American, 0.1% Native American, 3.7% Asian, 0.2% from other races, and 1.3% from two or more races. Hispanic or Latino of any race were 12.5% of the population.

There were 5,041 households, out of which 44.6% had children under the age of 18 living with them, 69.6% were married couples living together, 9.7% had a female householder with no husband present, and 16.1% were non-families. 11.8% of all households were made up of individuals, and 4.3% had someone living alone who was 65 years of age or older. The average household size was 3.26 and the average family size was 3.51.

In the CDP, the population was spread out, with 28.3% under the age of 18, 8.1% from 18 to 24, 34.3% from 25 to 44, 22.5% from 45 to 64, and 6.7% who were 65 years of age or older. The median age was 34 years. For every 100 females, there were 101.5 males. For every 100 females age 18 and over, there were 99.2 males.

The median income for a household in the CDP was $69,148, and the median income for a family was $72,750. Males had a median income of $50,075 versus $31,434 for females. The per capita income for the CDP was $23,755. About 2.1% of families and 3.0% of the population were below the poverty threshold, including 3.3% of those under age 18 and 3.9% of those age 65 or over.

Arts and culture
The Bald Hill Cultural Center features the outdoor Long Island Community Hospital Amphitheater.
The community has a residents association involved in such activities as planting trees and plants.

Government 
Brookhaven Town Hall is located on the east side of Bald Hill in the community.

Education
The area is home to several public and private schools. The Sachem School District serves the residents of Farmingville, and Sachem High School East is located next to Brookhaven Town Hall on the east side of Bald Hill.

Transportation
Farmingville is close to the major transportation hubs, Long Island MacArthur Airport and the Ronkonkoma Long Island Rail Road station. The LIRR Medford station is also nearby. The hamlet is accessible from the Long Island Expressway, exit 63.

References

Brookhaven, New York
Hamlets in New York (state)
Census-designated places in New York (state)
Census-designated places in Suffolk County, New York
Hamlets in Suffolk County, New York